Cluny is a hamlet in Alberta, Canada within Wheatland County.

The hamlet is located in Census Division No. 5 and in the federal riding of Crowfoot.

The hamlet takes its name from the Parish of Cluny in Scotland.

Demographics 

See also 
List of communities in Alberta
List of designated places in Alberta
List of former urban municipalities in Alberta
List of hamlets in Alberta

References 

Hamlets in Alberta
Former villages in Alberta
Designated places in Alberta
Populated places disestablished in 1995
Wheatland County, Alberta